Maganoor is a Mandal in Narayanpet district, Telangana.

Villages
The villages in Maganoor mandal include:
 Adivisatyar 	
 Ainapur 	
 Alampalle 	
 Chegunta 	
 Gudeballur 	
 Hindupur 	
 Kolpur 	
 Kothapalle
 Krishna 	
 Kunsi 	
 Maganoor 	
 Mandipalli 	
 Mudmal 	
 Neradgum 	
 Thangadigi 	
 Ujjelli
 Wadwat 	
 Warkoor

References

Mandals in Telangana